The All American Hockey League (AAHL) was a lower level professional ice hockey league with teams in the Midwestern United States. The league suspended operations for the 2011–12 season and subsequently folded.

League history

Inaugural season (2008–09)
The All American Hockey League was formed in 2008 as the All American Hockey Association when the Battle Creek Revolution and South Shore Shooters (later the Chi-Town Shooters) of the Mid-Atlantic Hockey League banded together with the Evansville IceMen and Motor City Gamblers (later the Detroit Dragons) of the Midwest Hockey League.

The Detroit Dragons folded mid-season, with the Chicago Blaze joining weeks later to fill the void. (The Blaze were originally going to be an expansion franchise for the 2009–10 season.)

On April 5, 2009, the Chi-Town Shooters became the first team to win the Champions Cup by defeating the Battle Creek Revolution in the best-of-five championship series.

On April 14, 2009, the AAHA Board of Directors announced a reorganization from an association format to a league format. This resulted in the All American Hockey Association being renamed the All American Hockey League.

Second season (2009–10)
On August 10, 2009, the AAHL announced a merger with the still-unlaunched Midwest Hockey League, absorbing the MWHL's Madison Ice Muskies as well as key MWHL personnel. The merged leagues continued under the AAHL name.

During the season, the Madison Ice Muskies and Chicago Blaze ceased operations due to financial problems. Also, the expansion Detroit Hitmen moved west to Muskegon, Michigan mid-season, and were re-christened the West Michigan Blizzard.

On April 15, 2010, the Evansville IceMen won the AAHL's Rod Davidson Cup (originally "Champions Cup" during the inaugural AAHA season) by beating the West Michigan Blizzard four games to one.

Third season (2010–11)
In June 2010, the IceMen AAHL franchise suspended operations when Evansville acquired a franchise in the CHL.

In August 2010, it was announced that the Madison Ice Muskies would be reinstated in the AAHL.

In August 2010, it was also announced that the Queen City Storm were approved for membership in the AAHL as an expansion team.

The Chi-Town Shooters left the league in August 2010 with plans to join a junior hockey league for the 2011–12 season.

In August 2010, the AAHL granted an expansion team to Lapeer, Michigan. A contest decided that Lapeer's team would be named the Lapeer Loggers.

On August 31, 2010, the Troy Bruins were officially announced as the sixth expansion team in the 2010–11 season.

In September 2010, the West Michigan Blizzard relocated to Dyer, Indiana, and were renamed the Indiana Blizzard.

On October 27, 2010, the Madison Ice Muskies moved to Wooster, Ohio, and became the Wooster Korn Kings. On November 17, 2010, the Korn Kings were taken over by the league and ceased operations.

On December 29, 2010, it was announced that the Indiana Blizzard were ceasing operations and the Chi-Town Shooters were returning for the remainder of the season, taking over all the Blizzard's players, as well as their current record. Despite keeping the "Chi-Town" moniker, they were based in Dyer, Indiana, instead of Chicago.

On January 3, 2011, the Lapeer Loggers were taken over by the league. Within days, the Bruins and Storm both ceased operations. Players from these three teams were brought together under the name Michigan Moose. The Moose, coached by AAHL commissioner Rod Davidson, were based in Battle Creek and played their home games in Revolution Arena, the same arena as the rival Battle Creek Revolution.

In February 2011, the Moose ceased operations.

In March 2011, the Battle Creek Revolution won their first Rod Davidson Cup.

Affiliations
Over the course of the league's history, various All American Hockey League teams have had affiliations with the ECHL (higher affiliate), IHL (higher affiliate), CHL (higher affiliate), and Greater Metro Junior A Hockey League (lower affiliate).

Teams year-by-year

Rod Davidson Cup
The Rod Davidson Cup was awarded to the annual playoff champion. It was known as the "Champions Cup" during the inaugural AAHA season, with the name change coming during the league's first season operating as the AAHL.

The winners were:
2009 – Chi-Town Shooters
2010 – Evansville IceMen
2011 – Battle Creek Revolution

Hockey Hall of Fame
On February 14, 2009, Kira Hurley of the Evansville IceMen became the first female goalie to register a point in a men's professional game. Because of this achievement, Kira is featured in the Hockey Hall of Fame in Toronto, Ontario, Canada. Kira's game memorabilia (goalie stick and game-worn jersey) is on permanent display in the minor league section of the Hockey Hall of Fame, along with the official scoresheet from the historic game.

Individual trophies and awards

See also
 List of ice hockey leagues

References

External links
Official AAHL website

 
2
Minor league ice hockey